() is a Sanskrit term which means  self-study and especially the recitation of the Vedas and other sacred texts.  It is also a broader concept with several meanings. In various schools of Hinduism, Svadhyaya is a Niyama (virtuous observance) connoting introspection and "study of self".

Etymology, meaning and usage
Svādhyāya is a compound Sanskrit word composed of sva (स्व) + adhyāya (अध्याय). Adhyāya means "a lesson, lecture, chapter; reading". Svā means "own, one's own, self, the human soul". Therefore, Svādhyāya literally means "one's own reading, lesson".

Svādhyāya is also a compound Sanskrit word composed of svā (स्वा) + dhyāya (ध्याय). Dhyāya means "meditating on". The root of Adhyāya and Dhyāya is “Dhyai” (ध्यै) which means “meditate, contemplate, think of”. The term Svādhyāya therefore, also connotes “contemplation, meditation, reflection of one self”, or simply “to study one’s own self”.

The term Svadhyaya has other meanings. In the Śruti, it refers to the historical practice of self-reciting Vedas to ensure it is memorized and faithfully transmitted, without writing, by the word of mouth, to the next generation. In various schools of Hinduism, particularly Yoga, Svadhyaya is also a niyama, a virtuous behavior. As a virtue, it means "study of self", "self-reflection", "introspection, observation of self".

 is translated in a number of ways. Some translate it as the "study of the scriptures and darśanas." Some translators simply use the word "study" without qualifying the type of study. MacNeill translates it as "self-study or spiritual self-education". Dhyāya, when used in the context of self study in ancient and medieval Indian texts, is synonymous with Abhyasa, Adhi and Viks; while Adhyāya, when used in context of reciting and reading in Indian texts, is synonymous with Anukti, Nipatha and Patha.

Svadhyaya in ancient literature

Upanishads
Taittiriya Upanishad’s hymn 1.9.1 emphasizes the central importance of Svadhyaya in one’s pursuit of Reality (Ṛta), Truth (Satya), Self-restraint (Damah), Perseverance (Tapas), Tranquility and Inner Peace (Samas), Relationships with others, family, guests (Praja, Prajana, Manush, Atithi) and all Rituals (Agnaya, Agnihotram).

Taittiriya Upanishad, however, adds in verse 1.9.1, that along with the virtue of  process of learning, one must teach and share (pravacana) what one learns. This is expressed by the phrase "", translated as "and learning and teaching" by Gambhīrānanda

In verse 1.11.1, the final chapter in the education of a student, the Taittiriya Upanishad reminds,

One of the earliest mention of Svādhyāya is found in Taittiriya Aranyaka 2.15: "" ("svādhyāya must be practiced"). Śatpath Brāhmana also repeats it. Chandogya Upanishad verse 4.16.1-2 recommends both silent (mānas) and vocal (vāchika) types of svādhyāya.

Other scriptures
Patanjali's Yogasutra, in verse II.44, recommends Svadhyaya as follows

Vishnu Smriti's verse 22.92, states that "human body is cleansed by water, the mind is cleansed by truth, the soul by self-study and meditation, while understanding is cleansed by knowledge".

Vasistha Dharmasastra verses 27.1 through 27.7 states that Svadhyaya helps an individual understand and overcome his past. Apastamba Dharmasutra 1.4.12.1 states Svadhyaya is a form of Tapas. This view is shared by Baudhayana Dharmasastra in verses 4.1.29 to 4.1.30, which adds that ‘‘svadhyaya is a means of getting past one’s past mistakes and any guilt”. Baudhayana Dharmasastra describes ‘‘Svadhyaya’’, in verse 2.6.11, as the path to Brahman (Highest Reality, Universal Spirit, Eternal Self).

 is mentioned as one of the virtues in Bhagavad Gita 16.1. Svadhyaya is mentioned a second time in Bhagavad Gita verse 17.15 as a component of the discipline of one's speech by which, states the verse, " speak words that are truthful, kind, helpful, and elevates those who hear it".

Svadhyaya as a historical practice
Learning one's Vedic recension
As a tool for memorization,  had a unique meaning for Vedic scholars as the principal tool for the oral preservation of the Vedas in their original form for millennia. When used as a formal part of scriptural study,  involves repeated recitations of scripture for purposes of mastering the mantras with their accurate pronunciation.

The Vedas had not been committed to writing in ancient times. Almost all printed editions depend on the late manuscripts that are hardly older than 500 years, not on the still-extant and superior oral tradition. Michael Witzel explains this oral tradition as follows:

The Vedic texts were orally composed and transmitted, without the use of script, in an unbroken line of transmission from teacher to student that was formalized early on.  This ensured an impeccable textual transmission superior to the classical texts of other cultures; it is, in fact, something like a tape-recording.... Not just the actual words, but even the long-lost musical (tonal) accent (as in old Greek or in Japanese) has been preserved up to the present."

Madhva, the dualistic Vaishnava philosopher, defined philosophy as the three-stage process of understanding, reflection, and application, expressing itself in two forms: study and teaching. Mādhavāchārya's views on svādhyāya are to be found in chapter 15 of Sarva-Darśana-Sangraha (cf. references).

The Taittirīya Upanishad, which belongs to the Yajur Veda, is still popular among those who learn Vedic chanting. Recitation of mantras (Japa) is an integral part of Bhakti Yoga, and in this tradition of Hinduism, it is sometimes called Japa Yoga.

Exceptions

Svadhyaya as a Niyama

Svādhyāya is one of the three key elements in the practice of yoga as defined in the Yoga Sutras of Patanjali, appearing in the opening verse of Book two on spiritual practice and elaborated upon in two other verses. Patanjali mentions  a second time as one of the five recommended observances (niyamas), along with purity, contentment, austerity, and self-surrender.

The practice of Svadhyaya as a Niyama is perfected in many forms. One form of Svadhyaya is mantra meditation, where certain sound constructs pregnant with meaning are recited, anchoring the mind to one thought. This practice helps draw the mind away from outward-going tendencies, silencing the crowding of thoughts, and ultimately towards inward feeling of resonance. It can alternately be any music, sermon, chant, inspirational book that absorbs the person to a state of absorption, trance, unifying oneness.

Svadhyaya is practiced as a self-reflection process, where one silently meditates, in Asana, on one's own behaviors, motivations and plans. Svadhyaya is, in a sense, for one's spirit and mind a process equivalent to watching one's body in a non-distorting mirror. This self-study, in Yoga, is not merely contemplation of one's own motives and behaviors, but also of one's circumstances and the environment one is in, assessing where one is in one's life, what is one's life direction, if and how desirable changes may lead to a more fulfilling Self.

Notes

References

. Four volumes.

Sanskrit and Hindi; Introduction has an English translation as well by Elliot M. Stern. Available from: ,  Research Centre, India.

(Manusmriti) : Available online as The Laws of Manu
.

. This work is entirely in Sanskrit.

 Two volumes. First published 1927 by the University of Calcutta.

Hindu philosophical concepts
Yoga concepts
Vedas
Jain philosophical concepts
Jain ethics
Hindu ethics